KOPY may refer to:

 KOPY (AM), a radio station (1070 AM) licensed to Alice, Texas, United States
 KOPY-FM, a radio station (92.1 FM) licensed to Alice, Texas, United States

See also
 Kopy, a village in Łódź Voivodeship in central Poland